Tiberiu is a Romanian-language masculine given name that may refer to:

Tiberiu Bălan
Tiberiu Bărbulețiu
Tiberiu Bone
Tiberiu Brediceanu
Tiberiu Brînză
Tiberiu Dolniceanu
Tiberiu Ghioane
Tiberiu Mikloș
Tiberiu Negrean
Tiberiu Olah
Tiberiu Popoviciu
Tiberiu Serediuc

Romanian masculine given names